Teodoreanu is a Romanian surname that may refer to:

Ionel Teodoreanu (1897–1954), Romanian novelist and lawyer
Păstorel Teodoreanu (1894–1964), Romanian humorist, poet and gastronome, brother of Ionel
Ștefana Velisar Teodoreanu (1897–1995), Romanian novelist, poet and translator, wife of Ionel

Romanian-language surnames